Evelyn Ebersis Young (November 17, 1915February 14, 1983) was an American film actress. At the height of her career in 1940, she appeared in 9 feature films. She was the leading female actress in The Wildcat of Tucson and Prairie Schooners, playing alongside Wild Bill Elliott and Dub Taylor in a Wild Bill Hickok series.

Young is familiar to fans of The Three Stooges as the wife of jealous drill sergeant Richard Fiske in the film Boobs in Arms. Young appeared in five films with the Stooges.

Acting career
In 1939, Young had an uncredited part in the Stooges' short film Three Sappy People. In 1940 she acted in nine feature films and five short films. Of the shorts, four more were with The Stooges, with Mrs. Dare in Boobs in Arms best noted and the only when credited in the titles. Young's theme in Boobs in Arms was summarized in her first long phrase: "I'm afraid my husband doesn't love me anymore!" The other short with Young's participation was The Spook Speaks with Buster Keaton.

In April 1940, The New York Times reported that Young was to receive a leading role in Babies for Sale. Young received lead roles in other Columbia films but that of Babies for Sale went to her friend Rochelle Hudson. The New York Times described Young as "a child star of fifteen years ago who was known as Evelyn Jennings". An Evelyn Jennings played her sole role of Agnes Jennings in the 1925 silent film The Overland Limited, exactly 15 years earlier.

Young played the character of Sadie among ten female "hobos" in the action film Girls of the Road. She was the lead actress in Prairie Schooners and The Wildcat of Tucson. Dorothy Andre was her stunt double in The Wildcat of Tucson.

On September 24, 1940 The New York Times published that Young had been terminated at Columbia Pictures. While the studio released movies with her participation until the very last day of December that year, this report coincides with the end of Young's acting career.

Personal and vital events
Evelyn Ebersis Young was born November 17, 1915, in Washington state. Her mother's maiden name was Rhodes.

At the age of 56, on March 27, 1971, Young married Nicholas Pisani in Orange County, California. Violinist Nick Pisani, who had been a recording musician for Bing Crosby, Dean Martin, and Frank Sinatra, was born in 1907 and would survive his wife by nearly four years.

In 1972, Young commented to the Associated Press on the untimely death of her friend and fellow Columbia actress, Rochelle Hudson. Hudson had died from a heart attack at the age of 55.

Young died on February 14, 1983, in Orange, California, aged 67.

Filmography

Movies

Television

References

External links
 
 Evelyn Young on AllMovie
 Evelyn Young on American Film Institute
 Evelyn Young on Kinopoisk
 Evelyn Young on ThreeStooges.net
 Evelyn Jennings on IMDb
 Evelyn Young footage from Three Stooges films on YouTube

1915 births
1983 deaths
20th-century American actresses
Actresses from Orange County, California
Actresses from Washington (state)
American child actresses
American film actresses
American silent film actresses
Western (genre) film actresses
Film serial actresses
20th-century American comedians